The Doug Mitchell Thunderbird Sports Centre (formerly UBC Winter Sports Centre, also known as UBC Thunderbird Arena) is a LEED Silver certified indoor arena in Greater Vancouver, on the campus of the University of British Columbia. Located in the University Endowment Lands, it is just outside the city limits of Vancouver, British Columbia. The arena is home to the UBC Thunderbirds men's and women's ice hockey teams, and contains one international-size 61 m × 30 m (200 ft × 98.4 ft) ice rink.

The facility was built around an older ice hockey facility, the historic Father Bauer Arena, which opened in October 1963. This was named after the late Father David Bauer, who, together with Bob Hindmarch, established Canada's first national hockey team at UBC in 1963 in preparation for the 1964 Winter Olympics. The UBC Thunderbird Arena replaced the Father Bauer Arena as the home of the UBC Thunderbirds ice hockey team. It is also the practice facility for  Vancouver's NHL team, the Vancouver Canucks.

The main ice rink has 7,500 seats and can expand to 8,000 for concerts. The other rinks are Father Bauer Arena and Protrans Arena with spectator capacities of 980 and 200, respectively.

Construction began in April 2006 with the refurbishment of the Father Bauer Arena and the addition of a new practice arena. The new stadium arena was opened on July 7, 2008.
On August 21, 2009, the Thunderbird Sports Centre was renamed Doug Mitchell Thunderbird Sports Centre in honour of Doug Mitchell, an UBC alumnus, lawyer, and amateur and professional sports leader.

2010 Vancouver Olympics
The venue was used for several men's and women's ice hockey at the 2010 Winter Olympics, and was used for sledge hockey in the 2010 Winter Paralympics.

Davis Cup
The venue was used in Canada's first round draw against France in the Davis Cup in February 2012, and it was used again in February and April 2013 when Canada faced Spain and then Italy.

2014 Special Olympics Canada Summer Games
The 2014 Special Olympics Canada Summer Games were held in Vancouver and the university was the host venue for the competition being held from July 7 to 13, 2014. The Games featured athletes with an intellectual disability from across the country competing in eleven sports, ten of which were also qualifiers for the 2015 Special Olympics World Summer Games in Los Angeles, California, United States.

Notable Events
Sodagreen - Meet again World Tour - 20 September 2015

A-Mei - Utopia World Tour - 29 November 2016

Joker Xue - Skyscraper World Tour - 3 November 2018

Olivia Rodrigo - Sour Tour - 7 April 2022

Carly Rae Jepsen - The So Nice Tour - October 29, 2022

Jackson Wang - Magic Man World Tour - April 30, 2023

References

External links
 Official website

Vancouver Canucks
Indoor arenas in British Columbia
Indoor ice hockey venues in Canada
Venues of the 2010 Winter Olympics
Olympic ice hockey venues
Sports venues in Vancouver
Tennis venues in Canada
University of British Columbia
University sports venues in Canada
UBC Thunderbirds
2008 establishments in British Columbia
Sports venues completed in 2008
Basketball venues in Canada
Badminton venues
Badminton in Canada
Tennis in British Columbia
National Hockey League practice facilities